Eipo (Eipomek), or Lik, is a Mek language of the eastern highlands of Eipumek District, Pegunungan Bintang Regency, Highland Papua. It spoken by the Eipo people who live along the Eipo River. A large percentage of its vocabulary is shared with Una and Tanime, and they form one dialect area.

Classification
Eipo belongs to the Eastern branch of Mek languages, which is a family of closely related languages belonging to the larger grouping of Trans-New Guinea languages.

Geographic distribution
The Eipo language is spoken by about 3,000 people along the Eipo River in the valley of Eipomek, which is situated in the eastern highlands of Highland Papua.

Phonology

Consonants
Eipo exhibits the following 16 phonemic consonants:

 /p/ indicates a labialized [pʷɵ].
 /c/ indicates a palatalized [tʲ].

Vowels
Eipo has five phonemic vowels:

Diphthongs are not regarded as separate phonemes.

Grammar

Morphology
Eipo is generally isolating language, but exhibits an elaborate system of agglutination in verb formation.

Syntax
The usual word order of Eipo is subject-object-verb (SOV).

Deictics
Eipo has only four basic spatial deictics, which are usually accompanied by pointing gestures, since the deictics are used during face-to-face communication to refer to positions relative to the person.
a- ‘here’
ei- ‘up there’
ou-, u- ‘down there’
or-, er- ‘across there’ (‘across-valley’)

Interrogatives
Eipo has many compound interrogatives:

yate ‘what?, which?, what kind of?’
yate anye ‘who?’
yate ate ‘why? (what for)’
yate arye ‘why? (what reason)’
yate-barye ‘why?’
yate-sum ‘when? (what day/time)’

dan- ‘where?, where to, whence’
dan-segum ‘whereabouts? (approximate location)’
dan-tam ("where side") ‘where, whence, whereto’
dan-ak ("where at") ‘where, whence, whereto’

Writing system
Eipo is not historically a written language, but in recent decades a Latin alphabet has been devised for it.

References

Heeschen, Volker and Wulf Schiefenhövel. 1983. Wörterbuch der Eiposprache: Eipo-Deutsch-Englisch. Berlin: Dietrich Reimer.

Mek languages
Languages of western New Guinea